McLemoresville is a town in Carroll County, Tennessee, United States. The population was 352 at the 2010 census. It is notable primarily as the birthplace, and final resting place, of television star Dixie Carter and her husband, actor Hal Holbrook.

Geography
McLemoresville is located in western Carroll County at  (35.987380, -88.577368).

McLemoresville is located at the intersection of U.S. Route 70A (Main Street/State Route 77) and State Route 105 (W College Street).

Demographics

As of the census of 2000, there were 259 people, 119 households, and 81 families residing in the town. The population density was 347.9 people per square mile (135.1/km2). There were 134 housing units at an average density of 180.0 per square mile (69.9/km2). The racial makeup of the town was 90.35% White, 6.18% African American, 0.39% Native American, 2.70% from other races, and 0.39% from two or more races. Hispanic or Latino of any race were 2.70% of the population.

There were 119 households, out of which 24.4% had children under the age of 18 living with them, 56.3% were married couples living together, 7.6% had a female householder with no husband present, and 31.1% were non-families. 30.3% of all households were made up of individuals, and 18.5% had someone living alone who was 65 years of age or older. The average household size was 2.18 and the average family size was 2.67.

In the town, the population was spread out, with 21.2% under the age of 18, 5.0% from 18 to 24, 27.4% from 25 to 44, 25.1% from 45 to 64, and 21.2% who were 65 years of age or older. The median age was 43 years. For every 100 females, there were 100.8 males. For every 100 females age 18 and over, there were 94.3 males.

The median income for a household in the town was $29,318, and the median income for a family was $37,083. Males had a median income of $35,417 versus $24,167 for females. The per capita income for the town was $15,962. About 2.6% of families and 4.3% of the population were below the poverty line, including none of those under the age of eighteen and 9.6% of those 65 or over.

The town is located in the West Carroll School District, and is home to a school for grades K through 2nd.

History

McLemoresville was once, briefly in the 19th century, the county seat for Carroll County, and was the largest town in the county. Bethel College (later Bethel University), the Cumberland Presbyterian Church's only four-year liberal arts college, began in McLemoresville, as did the denomination's theological school. Both later relocated to McKenzie, after the railroad companies laid down tracks in the mid-19th century and did not include McLemoresville. The town then started its decline. Later, in the 1950s, the Theological School moved to Memphis, where it was renamed Memphis Theological Seminary.

The town once had, in the mid-19th century, over 11 saloons, and several schools with boarding facilities, including the McLemoresville Collegiate Institute, the McLemoresville Women's Collegiate Institute, and others. It had several inns and restaurants.

The town's high school burned in the 1940s or 1950s and was not replaced. The school continued to educate children through the eighth grade. A new building was erected around 1958, and this building, with additions and modifications, now houses the grades K-2 for West Carroll School District.

The old McLemoresville Elementary School, which included a junior high school, participated in basketball and band. It was particularly successful in band and boys' basketball in the mid-to-late 1960s, winning county tournaments and band competitions around West Tennessee and the state. The school held annual beauty pageants for girls, had a very active Parents-Teachers Association, and the school partially integrated in 1965 and fully in 1966 (both without event) with the closure of the old MTA School for African-American students.
It was also known as Carrollton.

The town is called “McLee” (pronounced “MACK Lee”) by local residents.

McLemoresville,"McLee" was the beloved home of Dixie Carter from her earliest memories until her final rest.  Working with noted architect Hoyte Johnson, she helped to evolve her home-place into a comfortable venue to share with her family, her friends, and nearby Huntingdon College.  Her husband, Hal Holbrook referred to the home as having "feel" of the Mark Twain House in Hartford, Connecticut, and that there is no other place to which he feels so ideally suited. Besides the grand "Music Room" addition, the house is surrounded with the talented works of her mother, Virginia (Ginna) who built the expert masonry fireplaces and mantels in the older parts of the house, as well as the wooden guest house beneath the ancient Catalpa trees in the back yard.  Her father, Halbert Carter (Hal) remains forever present in the books that line the back room walls and the tapestry of tales told by a once great haberdasher.

Mayor Phil Williams has been holding his seat for 44 years making him the longest serving mayor in Tennessee history. 

The city holds a rental space for events called the McLemorseville Activities Center commonly known as the "MAC".

Media
Radio stations:
 WTPR-AM 710 "The Greatest Hits of All Time"

Newspapers:
Carroll County News-Leader

References

External links
 Information on McLemoresville at ePodunk.com

Towns in Carroll County, Tennessee
Towns in Tennessee